Rozay may refer to:

 Rozay-en-Brie, a commune in Seine-et-Marne, Île-de-France, France
 Aundrey Walker (born 1993), nicknamed Rozay, an American football player
 Rick Rozay, an alternative name for American rapper Rick Ross

See also
 Rosé (disambiguation)